Linda Osifo (born 27 July 1991) is a Nigerian actress and television host. She was first runner-up Miss Nigeria Entertainment Canada 2011 and 2nd runner up Miss AfriCanada 2011 beauty pageant. In 2015, Linda was nominated for the ELOY awards for her role in the hit TV series: Desperate Housewives Africa by Ebonylife TV– An adaptation of the ABC Studio franchise ‘Desperate Housewives’.

Early life 
Linda was born in Benin City, Edo State, Nigeria. She grew up with her grand mother and moved to Canada at the age of 16 but she spent most of her adult years in Toronto, Ontario, Canada before relocating to Lagos, Nigeria to pursue her acting career. She is the first daughter and middle child of her family. After graduating from St Thomas Aquinas High School, she obtained her Bachelors of Arts degree in Psychology from York University in Toronto Canada in 2013.

Career 
She had her debut acting role in 2012 when she starred in Family Secrets, in New Jersey, USA directed by Ikechukwu Onyeka. Upon her return to Nigeria in late 2013, she starred in her first Nollywood film, ‘King Akubueze’, directed by Nonso Emekewe. She was featured in the popular Nigerian soap opera Tinsel as ‘Nina Fire’. In 2017, Linda played the role of Adesuwa Dakolo in EbonyLife’s spin-off drama series, ‘Fifty’ and Africa Magic’s television series ‘Jemeji’, playing the role of Noweyhon. Osifo is currently co-hosting the "Give 'n' Take National Jackpot" gameshow alongside Segun Arinze.

During the 12th Headies Award she presented alongside Sina Peller the 'Best Vocal Performance (Male)' award which was won by artist Praiz and 'Best Vocal Performance (Female)' award which was won by Omawumi. In June 2018, she was involved in the Campari 'Make it Red' campaign being part of the cast in the advert alongside former Big Brother Nigeria housemate Tobi Bakre and artist 2baba.

Filmography

Film

Television

Music videos

Awards and recognition

Other ventures

Philanthropy

Passionate about selflessness, Linda’s philanthropic aspirations paved the way for her LAO Foundation, an acronym for Love and Oneness; an NGO posed with the task of eradicating poverty and illiteracy in Nigeria and Africa at large.  Love And Oneness (LAO Foundation), has made donations of seven sets of computers to the Little Saints Orphanage, Shasha, Akowonjo, Lagos.

See also
 List of Nigerian actors

References

External links 
 

Living people
Nigerian television actresses
Nigerian film actresses
21st-century Nigerian actresses
Actresses from Edo State
1991 births
Nigerian beauty pageant contestants
Nigerian philanthropists
Nigerian television personalities
Nigerian humanitarians
Nigerian television presenters